Peter Mutuku Mathuki (born 20 February 1969),   in Masinga Machakos.

Kenyan Diplomat, Private Sector Development Expert and politician who served as an EALA MP between 2012-2017 and  the  East African Business Council (EABC) from 2018 to 2021. He is  the 6th and current Secretary General of the East African Community. He was appointed to that position by the East African Community Heads of State on 27 February 2021.

Background and education
Mathuki holds a Master of Business Administration (MBA), and  a Doctor of Philosophy (PhD) in Strategic Management and Regional Integration from the University of Nairobi.

Career
Dr. Mathuki currently serves as the Secretary General of the East African Community (EAC), steering the Regional integration agenda.  He was appointed to that position by the East African Community Heads of State on 27 February 2021. He assumed office on 25 April 2021  replacing Libérat Mfumukeko.  He is also the current Chairperson of the COMESA-EAC-SADC Tripartite Task Force (TTF) which consists of 26 member countries.
  
He previously served as the executive director of the East African Business Council (EABC), (2018-2021) where he advocated  the voice of the private sector in East African Community decision-making processes and advocating for a conducive business environment for increased trade and investment in the bloc.

Between 2012 and 2017, Dr. Mathuki served as the  Member of Parliament of the East African Legislative Assembly (EALA) where he chaired the EALA Committee responsible for good governance and served on the Committee of Trade and Investment. He worked at the European Union (EU) programs for Africa based in Asmara, Eritrea (2010-2012) and prior to that, served as a Director in charge of International Labour Standards (ILO) at the International Confederation of Free Trade Unions (ICFTU-Africa now ITUC-Africa) (2004-2008).
He has actively played a pivotal role in overseeing the coming into effect of the African Continental Free Trade Area (AfCFTA), championed the formation of the African Business Council in a bid to reposition the EAC bloc to reap the benefits availed by the continental market. He has also been instrumental in creating several regional platforms, which were critical in the negotiation of the EAC Common Market Protocol such as; the East African Employers Association (EAEA) and the East African Trade Union Confederation (EATUC).

Other considerations
He sits on several boards including the Kenya Investment Authority (KenInvest), Inter-University Council for East Africa (IUCEA), Uganda and Centre of Excellence for ICT in East Africa (CENIT@EA), Tanzania and the Civil Aviation Safety and Security Oversight Agency (CASSOA) among others. He is also a member of the Kenya Institute of Management.

References

External links
Brief Bio
Website of the East African Community
Dr. Peter Mathuki appointed as the new EAC Secretary General As of 27 April 2021.

Living people
University of Nairobi alumni
Kenyan diplomats
Kenyan businesspeople
Members of the East African Legislative Assembly
East African Community officials
1969 births